This is a list of wars involving the Slovak Republic and its predecessor states. There have been 15 wars that ever included Slovakia, only one of them being after Slovakia became independent. The first war was the Hungarian–Czechoslovak War, which was between Hungary and Czechoslovakia. The most recent is the ongoing War on Terror.

First Czechoslovak Republic

Second Czechoslovak Republic

Slovak Republic

Third Czechoslovak Republic

Czechoslovak Socialist Republic

Czech and Slovak Federative Republic

Slovakia

References

 
Slovakia
Wars
Wars